Sweat is a 2015 play by American playwright Lynn Nottage. It won the 2017 Pulitzer Prize for Drama. The play premiered at the Oregon Shakespeare Festival in 2015; it was produced Off-Broadway in 2016 and on Broadway in 2017. The play is centered on the working class of Reading, Pennsylvania.

Background
Lynn Nottage, originally born and raised in Brooklyn, New York produced the award-winning play, Sweat. Lynn Nottage began working on the play in 2011 by interviewing numerous residents of Reading, Pennsylvania, which at the time was, according to the United States Census Bureau, officially one of the poorest cities in America, with a poverty rate of over 40%. The play was produced off-Broadway in 2016, and on-Broadway in 2017. Eventually in 2017, winning the Pulitzer prize award for drama. Nottage has said that she was particularly influenced by a New York Times article reporting on the city specifically, and by the Occupy Wall Street movement more generally. Before this, her inspiration came from her family. Mainly the women in her family who were teachers, activists, and artists. She witnessed these strong spoken women growing up, and wanted to do the same herself. She explored the effects on residents of the loss of heavy industry and the changing ethnic composition of the city. She has compared her time talking to former steelworkers in Reading with the occasion when she stayed in the town of Mansfield in the English Midlands and interviewed workers during the 1984 miners' strike. Nottage herself even spoke at the strike, which is what made her realize she had to do more. Seeing the effects of job loss and the economic struggle these people were facing first hand is what truly inspired her work for the play Sweat.

Plot
The play portrays a meeting between a parole officer and two ex-convicts, and three women who were childhood friends and had worked in the same factory. The action takes place in a fictional bar in Reading, Pennsylvania.

The plot consists of many different characters.  There are a group of friends that work for the steel factory.  The three friends' names are Tracy, Cynthia and Jessie.  Tracy is a middle aged white woman.  She loves to hang out at the bar with her friends and she has a gruff kind of humor.  She cannot stand the way Reading has been changing over the years.  Her friend Cynthia is a black woman who also loves to hang out with her friends at the bar and is a hardworking woman in the factory.  She is on and off with her husband, Brucie, who is addicted to drugs.  During the play Cynthia applies for a managing job at the plant which causes some problems.  Jessie, another worker at the factory, is not so happy with how her life has turned out and has some problems with alcohol abuse.  This is shown in many of the bar scenes.  The bartender in the play is Stan.  He used to work at the plant but he was injured from a factory accident. Oscar, the bus boy at the bar, is Latino and is not acknowledged often by the people who go there.  Some characters use racial slurs towards Latinos and show him that he isn't welcome in the Olstead factory.  Jason is a white man who is Tracey's son.  His best friend is Chris, Cynthia’s son.  They both work at the factory and worry that they will be laid off.  They both are arrested for assault and are released eight years later.  These are only the main characters. There are other minor characters in the plot of the play.

Nottage shifts in time, switching scenes and showing events of eight years earlier. Variety quotes the bartender, Stan, as warning the other characters that "You could wake up tomorrow and all your jobs are in Mexico", to which the characters respond with lethargy and disbelief. Variety described Nottage as going into "the heart of working-class America". Reviews of the play have described the characters as representing blue-collar workers who voted in Donald Trump as president.

The play also examines the disintegration of a friendship, after two of the women – one white, one black – apply for the same management job. The latter character gets the position, but soon the company moves jobs to Mexico. The trade union goes on strike, and company management locks out the workers. The management/worker division begins to separate the friends, and racial tensions separate them further.

Critical reception
The play has been described as "a powerful and emotional look at identity, race, economy, and humanity."

The play's political context has also been noted. Reviews focused on the similarities between the portrayal of the industrial working class in a Rust Belt town, and that being a significant area and demographic in the 2016 United States presidential election. The Wall Street Journal review suggested the play "explained" Trump's win. It said that the city was "synonymous with deindustrialisation", for the effects there of loss of heavy industry and related jobs.

The New Yorker said the play was "the first theatrical landmark of the Trump era". It also suggested that the play was reminiscent of the "working-class naturalism" of Clifford Odets, a playwright of the 1930s. The characters portrayed were associated with Trump's election campaign phrase of "the forgotten people". The Los Angeles Times also states, "The play seemed to analytically grasp what too many political pundits had missed: the seething anger that turned a reliable blue state such as Pennsylvania red".

Production history 
Sweat was first performed at the Oregon Shakespeare Festival in 2015 before playing at the Arena Stage in Washington, D.C. that year.

After starting previews on October 18, 2016, Sweat opened Off-Broadway at The Public Theater on November 3, 2016. It closed on December 18, 2016 to transfer to Broadway. Directed by Kate Whoriskey (who also directed the earlier productions), the cast featured Carlo Alban (Oscar), James Colby (Stan), Khris Davis (Chris), Johanna Day (Tracey), John Earl Jelks (Brucie), Will Pullen (Jason), Miriam Shor (Jessie), Lance Coadie Williams (Evan), and Michelle Wilson (Cynthia). The production began previews on Broadway at Studio 54 on March 4, 2017, before opening on March 26. The production closed on June 25, 2017, after 105 performances.

A London production opened at the Donmar Warehouse on 7 December 2018, running until 2 February 2019. The play was directed by Lynette Linton, and featured Clare Perkins and Martha Plimpton as the mothers and Osy Ikhile (Chris) and Parick Gibson (Jason). A  five-star review of the production by Peter Mason in the Morning Star newspaper described Sweat as "a tension-filled drama with a turbulent, consuming plot and a cast of highly engaging characters who demand attention from the off," adding of the Donmar cast that "it would be difficult to imagine a better set of players to take on the difficult task of portraying such complex individuals". The production transferred to the West End's Guielgud Theatre, running from 7 June 2019 to 20 July.

The Guthrie Theater ran a production from July 16 - August 21, 2022. Rohan Preston of the Star Tribune wrote of a key scene, saying "it puts an emotional capstone on a play that gives voice to some of the aches and frustrations that animate a nation unmoored by job displacement, thwarted dreams and self-medication."

Awards and nominations

Original London production 

The play was nominated for the 2017 Drama Desk Award, Outstanding Play and Outstanding Fight Choreography.

The play won the 2017 Obie Award for Playwrighting for the production at the Public Theater.

Sweat received three 2017 Tony Award nominations: Best Play and Best Performance by an Actress in a Featured Role in a Play for both Johanna Day and Michelle Wilson.

The play won the 2017 Pulitzer Prize for Drama.

References

External links
Internet Broadway Database
Internet Off-Broadway Database

2015 plays
Broadway plays
Plays about race and ethnicity
Plays by Lynn Nottage
Plays set in Pennsylvania
Pulitzer Prize for Drama winners